Cyvern: The Dragon Weapons is a vertically scrolling shoot 'em up released in 1998 by Japanese company Kaneko.

External links

Cyvern: The Dragon Weapons at Arcade History

1998 video games
Arcade video games
Arcade-only video games
Vertically scrolling shooters
Video games developed in Japan